Protests against Barack Obama occurred throughout the United States during Barack Obama's 2008 presidential campaign and during Obama's presidency. 

Many incidents of racism that occurred across the United States in the wake of Barack Obama's election as the country's first black president. These incidents included cross burnings, threats of violence, racial slurs, and other forms of harassment against black individuals, with many incidents being reported after the election. The Southern Poverty Law Center, which monitored hate crimes, noted an increase in such incidents following the election. Many people believed that these incidents reflected a deep-seated racism that continued to exist in America, even after Obama's historic election. The article quoted individuals who expressed frustration and anger with the changes that Obama represented, including one man who advocated for the deportation of all members of Obama's former church. Others noted that racism, like cancer, was never totally eliminated but instead was in remission.

Protests during the campaign

2008 

During the 2008 presidential election, particularly in the lead up to November 4, election day, numerous incidents against Obama were documented.

Protests during Obama's presidency

2009 
 April 15 – Tea Party protests against high taxes and big government were held in Lafayette Park.
 May 17 – The University of Notre Dame's selection of President Barack Obama as its commencement speaker led to a gathering the day before of around a hundred anti-abortion rights activists to protest against his invitation. The ceremony itself took place peacefully with the few hecklers shouted down and Obama receiving several standing ovations.
 July 4 –  About 2,000 small-government advocates gathered for Tea Party Day to protest the economic stimulus plan and health care initiative of the Obama administration and Congress.
 September 12 – Taxpayer March on Washington. Tea Party rally consisting of tens of thousands marched on Washington protesting the expansion of government spending.

2013 
 February 17 – Forward on Climate (not necessarily a protest against Obama as much as a protest to pressure Obama). An estimated 40,000 people rallied on the Mall and marched to the White House demanding action on climate change from President Obama and the government. Particular focus was put on stopping the expansion of the Keystone Pipeline.
July – Obama's visit to South Africa sparks protests against United States actions in the Middle East.

2015 
 June 22 – Protesters rallied at Times Square to denounce the Iran nuclear deal, with calls for Congress to reject the agreement.

2016 
 November 16 – Anti-Obama protests were held in Athens, Greece during his visit there, and became violent after Greek riot police used tear gas.

See also 
 Public image of Barack Obama
 Timeline of protests against Hillary Clinton
Protests against George W. Bush
Protests against Donald Trump
 Tea Party protests
White backlash

References 

Protests in the United States
Protests against results of elections
Barack Obama controversies